Hoy, was a daily publication in Ecuador, was published from June 7, 1982 until August 26, 2014. Its editorial office is located in Quito, and it is currently published simultaneously in Guayaquil in electronic format. It was created by Jaime Mantilla Anderson. During its life, Hoy earned a reputation for openness to all political views in the Ecuadorian press.

Hoy'''s group of companies other products include the MetroHOY, distributed, in the public areas of the mass transport systems of Quito; MetroQuil, distributed in Metrovia of Guayaquil; The magazines Hoy Domingo (Sunday Today), Cometa (Comet), La Guía Inmobiliaria (Real Estate Guide) and the printing of Newsweek en Español (Newsweek'' in Spanish).

External links

Newspapers published in Ecuador
Publications established in 1982
Mass media in Quito
1982 establishments in Ecuador